Puducherry consists of 5 municipalities. Two of them are located in Puducherry district, while the other is located in Karaikal district, Mahe district, and Yanam district. All the municipalities come under the local administration department of the Government of Puducherry.

List

Puducherry District
 Pondicherry Municipality–The total area is 19.46 km2. The 2011 population was 2,44,377. The Municipality is divided into 42 wards comprising 8 Assembly Constituencies.
 Ozhukarai or Oulgaret Municipality–The total area is 36.75 km2. The 2011 population was 3,00,150. The Municipality is divided into 37 wards.

Karaikal District
 Karaikal–the Population as per 2011 census is 86,838. It is divided into 18 wards.

Mahe District
 Mahe Municipality–The 2011 population was 41,816. It is divided into 15 wards.

Yanam District
 Yanam–The 2011 population was 55,626. It is divided into 10 wards.

References

Puducherry-related lists
Cities and towns in Puducherry